The women's 100 metres event at the 1997 European Athletics U23 Championships was held in Turku, Finland, on 10 and 11 July 1997.

Medalists

Results

Final
11 July
Wind: 1.6 m/s

Heats
10 July
Qualified: first 3 in each heat and 2 best to the Final

Heat 1
Wind: 2.5 m/s

Heat 2
Wind: 1.6 m/s

Participation
According to an unofficial count, 14 athletes from 9 countries participated in the event.

 (2)
 (2)
 (1)
 (1)
 (2)
 (2)
 (1)
 (2)
 (1)

References

100 metres
100 metres at the European Athletics U23 Championships